DiKtatoR 17 is a punk rock/Jewish album, first released independently by outsider musician
Steve Lieberman (The Gangsta Rabbi) (born 1958) as his 17th album on  17 November 2009. Shortly after, Lieberman, then age 51 
was signed to Jewish Independent Label, JDub Records for a multi-album deal 
who released DiKtatoR 17 as their 27th release out of 35 on 20 April 2010.

Both the lead-off single "Obama-Rama Yeah!" and "Little Kosher Girl"

from the cd reached the #1 position on SoundClick.com's Global Alternative genre charts which hosts 176,000 songs.

Track #8 on the cd, "I Wish That I Was Hot" received airplay on the "Anything Anything" radio program before the release of DiktatoR 17 on commercial rock radio WRXP 101.9 New York City 
where DJ Rich Russo described Lieberman as 'Jethro Tull meets the Beastie Boys'.

Critical reception

The critics' reviews on DikTatoR 17 were mixed

Senior Editor C.W. Ross at IndieStop/CD Reviewer says 'I respect the fact that Lieberman is not afraid to tackle any subject matter in the songs on this album, from his struggles with bi-polar depression, pride in Jewish heredity, anti-racism, politics, sex and animal rights....his flute work hearkens up Jethro Tull and his overdriven bass sounds give the cd a different edge.-what he plays is what you hear... Like all of Lieberman's, you'll either appreciate the raw experimental raw-edge style he delivers, or you'll think he's a total madman, either way, you'll walk away with a very strong opinion of what you just heard... Rating: 8.1/10 

Carly Doenges of MuzikReviews said of DiKtatoR 17 ' Have you ever heard a song on the radio and wonder how that artist ever got a record contract? That's the feeling I get when listening to Steve Lieberman the Gangsta Rabbi's latest DiKtatoR 17...If Lieberman is going for any kind of wit or social commentary, the message is lost as the lyrics are too difficult to understand...although (DiKtator 17) was the album that got Lieberman signed to JDub Records, have a listen and decide for yourself whether it was from talent or just sheer persistence' Rating: 0.5/5.0 

In his 2009 review of DiKtator 17, writer Wildy Haskell states 'Steve Lieberman AKA The Gangsta Rabbi is about as eclectic as they come. While he could be dismissed as a novelty, he is a genuine street poet speaking the vernacular that exists in the ghetto...DiKtatoR 17 could be the best Lieberman ever did, because the humanity in his music is getting more and more human with time. Rating 4 Stars out of 5

Track listing

Personnel
Steve Lieberman - bass guitars, vocals, flutes, recorders, trombone, melodica, beatmachines

Videos

References

Steve Lieberman albums
2009 albums
Folk punk albums